The 2019 Copa América was the 46th edition of the Copa América, the international men's association football championship organized by South America's football ruling body CONMEBOL. It was held in Brazil and took place between 14 June and 7 July 2019 at 6 venues across the country. This is the first time since 1991 where no CONCACAF nation took part in the tournament.

Heading into the tournament, Chile were the two-time defending champions, having won the 2015 and 2016 editions of the tournament, but were eliminated by Peru in the semi-finals leading to the third place match against Argentina, which they also lost.

Host nation Brazil won their ninth title by defeating Peru 3–1 in the final. Argentina took third place by beating Chile 2–1 in the third-place match.

Host country

Originally, the 2019 Copa América was to be hosted by Chile, while Brazil was due to host the 2015 Copa América, because CONMEBOL normally rotates tournament host nations in alphabetical order. However, because Brazil hosted the 2013 FIFA Confederations Cup, the 2014 FIFA World Cup, and the 2016 Summer Olympics, Brazil decided against also hosting the 2015 Copa América. Brazil's and Chile's football federations agreed to swap their host nation order for the 2015 and 2019 championships, and CONMEBOL approved this agreement in 2012.

Starting in 2021 (originally scheduled for 2020), Copa América will be held in the same years as the UEFA European Championship.

Venues
On 14 June 2018, CBF Vice President Fernando Sarney announced that five cities would host the tournament: Salvador, Rio de Janeiro, São Paulo, Belo Horizonte and Porto Alegre. The list of stadia was decided on 17 September 2018. The opening match was held at the Estádio do Morumbi in São Paulo, the semi-finals were held at the Arena do Grêmio in Porto Alegre and Estádio Mineirão in Belo Horizonte, and the final was held at the Estádio do Maracanã in Rio de Janeiro. On 23 November 2018, CONMEBOL announced that the second São Paulo venue would be changed from the Allianz Parque to Arena Corinthians.

Teams
Apart from all ten CONMEBOL national teams which were eligible to enter, CONMEBOL initially planned to hold a 16-team tournament by inviting six teams from outside CONMEBOL, similar to the Copa América Centenario three years earlier. On 16 March 2018, CONMEBOL announced three teams from CONCACAF and three teams from the Asian Football Confederation (AFC) would be invited to participate in the 2019 Copa América. On 12 April 2018, it was announced that Qatar, the host of the 2022 FIFA World Cup, had accepted the invitation. On 4 May 2018, CONMEBOL announced that the tournament would instead be played with 12 teams, the same number as previous editions since 1993 (apart from the Copa América Centenario held in 2016), with the two guest teams being Qatar and Japan from the AFC. Both teams managed to reach the final of the 2019 AFC Asian Cup held in the UAE, which was won by Qatar.

Qatar made their debut appearance in the Copa América, becoming the first Arab nation to play in the tournament, while Japan made their second appearance, their first since 1999. This was also the first Copa América to not feature any team from CONCACAF since teams had been invited; in particular, Mexico, which competed in all ten editions since 1993 as an invited team, did not participate in this tournament. United States competed in four tournaments, including the 2016 event as host.

 (hosts)
 (title holders)

 (invitee)

 (invitee)

Draw
The draw of the tournament took place on 24 January 2019, 20:30 BRST (UTC−2), at the Cidade das Artes in Rio de Janeiro, Brazil. The 12 teams were drawn into three groups of four, by selecting one team from each of the 4 ranked pots.

At the CONMEBOL Council meeting held on 23 November 2018, it was decided that FIFA Ranking would be the basis to determine the seeds and the distribution of the rest of teams in the pots of the draw. This decision will also be valid for future editions of the Copa America.

For the draw, the teams were allocated to four pots based on the FIFA World Ranking of December 2018 (shown in brackets). Pot 1 contained the hosts Brazil (who were automatically assigned to position A1) and the best two teams, pot 2 contained the next best three teams, and so on for pots 3 and 4. The teams from Pot 1 would be assigned to position 1 in their group, while the teams from Pots 2, 3 and 4 would be drawn to one of the positions 2, 3 or 4 in their group. The two guest teams, Japan and Qatar, which were seeded in different pots, could not be drawn in the same group.

Match officials
A total of 23 referees and 23 assistant referees were appointed for the tournament on 21 March 2019.

Squads

Each team had to submit a list of 23 players (three of whom had to be goalkeepers).

Group stage
The match schedule was announced on 18 December 2018. The winners and runners-up of each group and the two best third-placed teams among all groups advanced to the quarter-finals.

All times are local, BRT (UTC−3).

Tiebreakers
The ranking of teams in the group stage was determined as follows:
 Points obtained in all group matches (three points for a win, one for a draw, none for a defeat);
 Goal difference in all group matches;
 Number of goals scored in all group matches;
 Points obtained in the matches played between the teams in question;
 Goal difference in the matches played between the teams in question;
 Number of goals scored in the matches played between the teams in question;
 Fair play points in all group matches (only one deduction could be applied to a player in a single match): 
 Drawing of lots.

Group A

Group B

Group C

Ranking of third-placed teams

Knockout stage

In the knockout stage, if a match was tied after 90 minutes:
In the quarter-finals, extra time was not played, and the match was decided by a penalty shoot-out.
In the semi-finals, third place play-off and final, extra time could be played, where a fourth substitute would be allowed for each team. If still tied after extra time, the match was decided by a penalty shoot-out.

Bracket

Quarter-finals

Semi-finals

Third place play-off

Final

Statistics

Goalscorers

Winners

Awards
The following awards were given at the conclusion of the tournament.
 Golden Ball Award:  Dani Alves
 Golden Boot Award:  Everton (3 goals)
 Golden Glove Award:  Alisson Becker
 Fair Play Award:

Final Man of the Match Award 
  Everton Soares

Team of the Tournament
The Technical Study Group announced the tournament's Best XI squad.

Final ranking
As per statistical convention in football, matches decided in extra time were counted as wins and losses, while matches decided by penalty shoot-out were counted as draws.

Marketing

Mascot

The mascot of the tournament was Zizito, a capybara whose name paid homage to Zizinho, the Brazilian footballer who shared the all-time goal-scoring record in the Copa América (17 goals) with Argentina's Norberto Doroteo Méndez.

Slogan
The slogan of the 2019 Copa América was "Vibra el Continente/Vibra o Continente" (Rocking the Continent).

Official song
"Vibra Continente" by Brazilian recording artist Léo Santana and Colombian recording artist Karol G served as an official song for the tournament.

Broadcasting rights

CONMEBOL

Rest of world

Notes

References

External links

 
Copa América Brasil 2019, CONMEBOL.com
CONMEBOL Copa América 2019 Technical Study

 
2019
2019 in South American football
2019 in Brazilian football
2019 Copa America
June 2019 sports events in South America
July 2019 sports events in South America